Lourenço Beirão da Veiga (born 7 September 1979) is a Portuguese auto racing driver.

Career
He competed in the 2002 Formula Renault 2000 Eurocup season. In 2008 he competed in the SEAT León Eurocup. A win in race six at his home circuit in Estoril, saw him rewarded with entry into one round of the World Touring Car Championship with the SUNRED Engineering team at Brands Hatch.

His first major title came in 2009, winning the Spanish GT Championship along with fellow Portuguese driver Ricardo Bravo.

Racing record

Complete WTCC results
(key) (Races in bold indicate pole position) (Races in italics indicate fastest lap)

References

External links
Lourenço Beirão da Veiga at AvM website 

1979 births
Living people
Portuguese racing drivers
Italian Formula Renault 2.0 drivers
Formula Renault Eurocup drivers
Euroformula Open Championship drivers
World Touring Car Championship drivers
SEAT León Eurocup drivers
Blancpain Endurance Series drivers
International GT Open drivers
24 Hours of Spa drivers

Racing Engineering drivers
Cram Competition drivers
Teo Martín Motorsport drivers